Montrésor is a commune in the Indre-et-Loire department, Centre-Val de Loire, France.

Geography
The village lies on the right bank of the Indrois, which flows northwest through the middle of the commune.

Population

See also
Communes of the Indre-et-Loire department

References

Communes of Indre-et-Loire
Plus Beaux Villages de France